Warren Boyd (23 December 1926 – 17 December 2018) was an Australian swimmer. He competed in the men's 100 metre freestyle at the 1948 Summer Olympics.

References

External links
 

1926 births
2018 deaths
Australian male freestyle swimmers
Olympic swimmers of Australia
Swimmers at the 1948 Summer Olympics
Swimmers from Sydney
20th-century Australian people